Orizari is a village in the municipality of Kočani, North Macedonia. It used to be a municipality of its own. The name of the school in Orizari is Krste Petkov Misirkov.

Demographics
According to the 2002 census, the village had a total of 3,776 inhabitants. Ethnic groups in the village include:

Macedonians 3,768

References

Villages in Kočani Municipality